The March 1960 nor'easter was a severe winter storm that impacted the Mid-Atlantic and New England regions of the United States. The storm ranked as Category 4, or "crippling", on the Northeast Snowfall Impact Scale. Northeasterly flow, combined with the storm's slower forward motion, enhanced snowfall across the region. The cyclone began moving away from the United States on March 5. It took place during a stormy period in the affected region, contributing to record snowfall.

Impact
The storm's impacts were wide-reaching; snow accumulated from the southeastern United States through northern New England. Totals exceeding  were reported from West Virginia to Maine, while snowfall of over  fell in parts of eastern Massachusetts, Rhode Island, northern Connecticut, southern New Hampshire, northern New Jersey and southeastern New York. Nantucket, Massachusetts reported  of snow, the most on record.

Blizzard conditions organized in eastern Massachusetts, accompanied by intense winds. The storm caused at least 80 fatalities and stranded thousands of residents. Schools were forced to close, and transportation was severely disrupted. Stalled vehicles on roadways hampered snow removal efforts. New York City received the most severe winter storm since 1948. Many commuters in Manhattan became marooned. Major airports closed during the storm, resulting in the cancellation of hundreds of flights.

See also

Climate of the United States
List of NESIS storms

References

 

Nor'easters
1960 meteorology
1960 natural disasters in the United States